Walter Raymond (13 March 1852 – 2 April 1931) was an English novelist.

He wrote many novels between 1890 and 1928, primarily based in Somerset, and also wrote under the pseudonym Tom Cobbleigh. Some of his titles include Gentleman Upcott's Daughter (1892), Love and Quiet Life (1894), Fortune's Darling (1901), and Verity Thurston (1926).

Walter Raymond married Mary Johnston in 1878. They had five daughters and three sons.
He died in Southampton on 2 April 1931 at the age of 79. There is a memorial to him in Yeovil Public Library in Somerset, designed by William Worrall.

Raymond's work is long out of print and currently gets little attention, although some novels are now available for free online.

One of Walter Raymond's first cousins was William Raymond. See latest news

Selected publications

as Tom Cobbleigh
  Vol. 2

References

External links
Gentleman Upcott's daughter (1892) (at archive.org)
Article on Walter Raymond from Feb. 1895 edition of The Bookman (New York)
Latest News from 29 July 2022 :  New Zealand artist's family tree has links to Yeovil in Somerset County Gazette, England 
https://www.somersetcountygazette.co.uk/news/20586989.new-zealand-artists-family-tree-links-yeovil/
Wilmington artist Elisabeth Chant influential 75 years after death (starnewsonline.com) - Family of William Raymond Yeovil
WalterRaymond

1852 births
1931 deaths
19th-century English novelists
20th-century English novelists
English male novelists
19th-century English male writers
20th-century English male writers